Business performance management (BPM), also known as corporate performance management (CPM) and enterprise performance management (EPM),) is a set of performance management and analytic processes that enables the management of an organization's performance to achieve one or more pre-selected goals. Gartner retired the concept of "CPM" and reclassified it as "financial planning and analysis (FP&A)," and "financial close" to reflect two concepts: increased focus on planning and the emergence of a new category of solutions supporting the management of the financial close.

Business performance management is contained within approaches to business process management.

History 
Before the Information Age in the late 20th century, businesses sometimes laboriously collected data from non-automated sources. As they lacked computing resources to analyze the data properly, they often made commercial decisions primarily by intuition.

As businesses started automating their processes, the availability of data increased. However, collection often remained a challenge due to a lack of infrastructure for data exchange or incompatibilities between systems. Reports on the gathered data sometimes took months to generate and these delays allowed lack of informed strategic decision-making.

In 1989 Howard Dresner, a research analyst at Gartner, popularized "business intelligence" (BI) as an umbrella term to describe a set of concepts and methods to improve business decision-making by using fact-based support systems. Performance management builds on a foundation of BI but combines it with the planning-and-control cycle of the enterprise with enterprise planning, consolidation, and modeling capabilities.

The advent of increasing standards, automation, and technologies led to vast amounts of data becoming available. Data warehouse technologies allowed the building of repositories to store this data. Improved ETL and enterprise application integration tools have increased the timely collection of data. OLAP reporting technologies allowed faster generation of new reports which analyze the data. , business intelligence has become the art of collecting large amounts of data, extracting useful information, and turning that information into actionable knowledge.

Definition and scope 
Business performance management has three main activities:

 Selection of goals
 Consolidation of data that is relevant to an organization's progress
 Interventions made by managers based on the data reviewed to improve future performance

All three activities typically run concurrently, with interventions affecting the selection of goals, the information monitored, and the activities undertaken by the organization.

Frameworks 
Various frameworks for implementing business performance management exist. Companies use a top-down framework to align planning and execution, strategy and tactics, and business-unit and enterprise objectives. Reaction frameworks include the Six Sigma strategy, Balanced Scorecard, Activity-Based Costing (ABC),  Objectives and Key Results (OKR), Total Quality Management, Economic Value-Add, Integrated Strategic Measurement, and Theory of Constraints.

Design and implementation

Selection of goals 

Goal-alignment queries

 Determine the short and medium-term purpose of the program. What strategic goal(s) of the organization will the program address? What organizational mission/vision does it relate to? A hypothesis needs to be crafted that details how this initiative will eventually improve results/performance (i.e., a strategy map).

Goals are updated regularly based on the results metrics. Businesses start a BPM program by setting corporate goals before determining the means to achieve them. Results are closely monitored to modify goals. For example, if a managerial decision increased worker productivity, the business may decide to reinforce the goal. Goals are rulers to businesses for measuring success. A business may not necessarily exclusively set financial goals. They may choose to set goals in other aspects such as managerial or ethical goals.

Information monitoring 

Baseline queries
 Assess current information-gathering competency. Does the organization have the capability to monitor important sources of information? What data is being collected, and how is it being stored? What are the statistical parameters of this data, e.g., how much random variation does it contain? Is this being measured?
Cost and risk queries
 Estimate the financial consequences of a new BI initiative. Assess the cost of the existing operations and the increase in costs associated with the BPM initiative. What is the risk that the initiative will fail? This risk assessment should be converted into a financial metric and included in the planning.

Information monitoring, also known as information consolidation, is a business process where data is gathered and filtered. Software aids businesses analyze the data and presents it in a comprehensible manner to allow managers to make decisions accordingly. Individual companies define their own sets of metrics and KPIs used by software to create data reports. 

Metrics-related queries
Information requirements need operationalization into clearly defined metrics. Decide which metrics to use for each piece of information being gathered. Are these the best metrics, and why? How many metrics need to be tracked? If this is a large number (it usually is), what kind of system can track them? Are the metrics standardized so that they can be benchmarked against performance in other organizations? What are the industry standard metrics available?
Measurement methodology-related queries
Establish a methodology or a procedure to determine the best way of measuring the required metrics. How frequently will data be collected? Are there any industry standards for this? Is this the best way to do the measurements? How do we know that?

Managerial adjustments 
After reviewing the data, the business intervenes and reviews its original goals, and then proposes new measures to improve business efficiency and profitability. The adjustments are reflected in future data analyses. 

Results-related queries
Monitor the BPM program to ensure that it meets objectives. The program itself may require adjusting. The program should be tested for accuracy, reliability, and validity. How can it be demonstrated that the BI initiative, and not something else, contributed to a change in results? How much of the change was probably random?

Considerations of implementation 
Additional questions may arise when implementing a business performance management program which involve stakeholders in the business and the economy, including investors, vendors, partners, and competition.

Customer and stakeholder queries
Determine who will benefit from the initiative and who will pay. Who has a stake in the current procedure? What kinds of customers/stakeholders will benefit directly from this initiative? Who will benefit indirectly? What quantitative/qualitative benefits follow? Is the specified initiative the best or only way to increase satisfaction for all kinds of customers? How will customer benefits be monitored? What about employees, shareholders, and distribution channel members?

Metrics and key performance indicators 
Items of generic importance include:

 Consistent and correct KPI-related data providing insights into operational aspects of a company
 Timely availability of KPI-related data
 KPIs designed to reflect the efficiency and effectiveness of a business directly
 Information presented in a format which aids decision-making for management and decision-makers
 Ability to discern patterns or trends from organized information

Areas in which management may gain insights using business performance management include real-time dashboard on key operational metrics, customer-related statistics, marketing-channel analysis, and campaign management. 

Although the following list describes what a bank might monitor, it can apply to similar service-sector companies. 

 real-time dashboard on key operational metrics
overall equipment effectiveness
clickstream analysis on a website
 key product portfolio trackers

 customer-related statistics:
 new customers acquisition
 customers retention
 attrition of customers (including breakup by reason for attrition)
 turnover generated by segments of the customers (possibly using demographic filters)
 outstanding balances held by segments of customers and terms of payment (possibly using demographic filters)
 collection of bad debts within customer relationships
delinquency analysis of customers behind on payments
profitability of customers by demographic segments and segmentation of customers by profitability
campaign management, market research, and analysis:
demographic analysis of individuals (potential customers) applying to become customers, and the levels of approval, rejections, and pending numbers
marketing-channel analysis
sales-data analysis by product segments
call center metrics

Business performance management integrates the company's processes with CRM or  ERP. Companies may use it to gauge customer satisfaction, control customer trends, and influence shareholder value.

Technology 
Because of business performance management, activities in large organizations often involve collecting and reporting large volumes of data. Many software vendors, particularly those offering business intelligence tools, will market products intended to assist in this process. As a result of this marketing effort, business performance management is often incorrectly understood as an activity that relies on software systems to work, and many definitions of business performance management explicitly suggest software as being a definitive component of the approach.

This interest in business performance management from the software community is interpreted by some to be sales-driven.

Since 1992, business performance management has been influenced by the rise of the balanced scorecard framework. Managers can use the balanced scorecard framework to clarify the goals of an organization, identify how to track them, and decide if intervention is necessary. These steps are the same as those that are found in BPM, and as a result, a balanced scorecard can be used as the basis for business performance management activity with organizations.

, owners sought to drive strategies throughout their organizations, to transform these strategies into actionable metrics, and to use analytics to expose the cause-and-effect relationships that could give insights into decision-making.

Business performance management consists of a set of management and analytic processes, supported by technology, which enables businesses to define strategic goals and then measure and manage performance against those goals. Core business performance management processes include financial planning, operational planning, business modeling, consolidation, reporting, analysis, and monitoring of key performance indicators linked to strategy.

Business performance management involves data consolidation from various sources, querying and analysis of the data, and putting the results into practice.

Application software types
People working in business intelligence have developed tools that ease the work of business performance management, especially when the business-intelligence task involves gathering and analyzing large amounts of unstructured data.

Tool categories commonly used for business performance management include:

 MOLAP — Multidimensional online analytical processing, sometimes simply called "analytics" (based on dimensional analysis and the so-called "hypercube" or "cube")
 scorecarding, dashboarding and data visualization
 data warehouses
 document warehouses
 text mining
 DM — data mining

 BPO — business performance optimization
 EPM — enterprise performance management
 EIS — executive information systems
 DSS — decision support systems
 MIS — management information systems
 SEMS — strategic enterprise management software
 EOI — Enterprise operational intelligence software

See also
 Business process management
 Data visualization
 Electronic performance support systems
 Integrated business planning
 IT performance management
 List of management topics

References

Further reading

 Dimon, Ron, "Enterprise Performance Management Done Right". 2013 
 Mosimann, Roland P., Patrick Mosimann and Meg Dussault, The Performance Manager. 2007 
 Performance Leadership, Frank Buytendijk, 2008, McGraw-Hill, 
 Dresner, Howard, The Performance Management Revolution: Business Results Through Insight and Action. 2007 
 Dresner, Howard, Profiles in Performance: Business Intelligence Journeys and the Roadmap for Change. 2009 
 Cokins, Gary, Performance Management: Integrating Strategy Execution, Methodologies, Risk, and Analytics. 2009 
 Cokins, Gary, Performance Management: Finding the Missing Pieces (to Close the Intelligence Gap). 2004 
 Paladino, Bob, Five Key Principles of Corporate Performance Management. 2007 
 Wade, David and Ronald Recardo, Corporate Performance Management. Butterworth-Heinemann, 2001 
 Coveney, Michael, Strategy to the Max FSN Publishing Limited, 2010 
Michael Hammer, Beyond Re engineering:How the Process-Centered Organization Is Changing Our Work and Our Lives(New York: Harper Collins Publishers, 1996).
H. James Harrington, Business Process Improvement: The Breakthrough Strategy for Total Quality, Productivity, and Competitiveness(New York: Mc Graw-Hill,1991).
Bjorn Andersen, Business Process Improvement Toolbox(Milwaukee, WI: ASQ Quality Press, 1999).
H. James Harrington, Business Process Improvement Workbook: Documentation, Analysis, Design, and Management of Business Process Improvement(New York:Mc Graw-Hill, 1997).

External links

 Plug-In T12 Business Process http://www.sci.brooklyn.cuny.edu/~firat/mis/PlugInT12.pdf 

 Business Finance: Bred Tough: The Best-of-Breed, 2009 (July 2009)

Organizational performance management
Business intelligence terms
Information technology management